Denise Fabre (born 5 September 1942) is a French former television personality, best known for her role as an in-vision continuity announcer. She is now municipal advisor to the presiding mayor of Nice, Christian Estrosi.

Biography
Fabre, born in Cagnes-sur-Mer, began her career with Télé Monte Carlo in 1961 before she progressed to announcing work with Antenne 2 (now France 2) and most famously, TF1, where Fabre was chief announcer until live continuity was axed in 1992. She co-hosted the Eurovision Song Contest 1978 which was staged in Paris, as well as a variety of French television programmes during the 1970s and 1980s.

See also
 List of Eurovision Song Contest presenters

References

External links

1942 births
Living people
People from Cagnes-sur-Mer
French television presenters
French women television presenters
Radio and television announcers
French political commentators